Alexandru Mihail Băluță (born 13 September 1993) is a Romanian professional footballer who plays as an attacking midfielder or a forward for Nemzeti Bajnokság I. club Puskás Akadémia.

Club career

Early years
Băluță started his senior career at AFC Chindia Târgoviște in 2011, making 44 appearances and scoring fourteen goals in the second division over the course of two seasons. In 2013, he signed with Viitorul Constanța, for which he played his first Liga I game against Dinamo București on 5 August.

Universitatea Craiova

Băluță moved to CS Universitatea Craiova for €200,000 in the summer of 2014. He made his competitive debut for the Alb-albaștrii in a Cupa Ligii match with Rapid București on 16 July, featuring the full 90 minutes in the 0–1 away loss. Băluță scored his first goal in a Cupa României 2–1 extra time victory over his former club Viitorul, on 29 October 2014.

In the summer of 2017, Băluță changed his squad number from 22 to 10, previously worn by Gustavo Vagenin who also switched to number 7. In August that year, Craiova refused to negotiate with FC Steaua București for the transfer of the player.

On 19 April 2018, Băluță netted the first hat-trick of his professional career, contributing to a 5–1 home success against FC Botoșani for the season's Cupa României. In the final on 27 May, he offered an assist to Alexandru Mitriță as Universitatea Craiova won 2–0 against Hermannstadt.

Slavia Prague
On 22 June 2018, Băluță signed a four-year contract with Czech team Slavia Prague, being assigned the number 20 shirt. Press reported the transfer fee at €3 million.

Puskás Akadémia
On 31 July 2020, Băluță signed a three-year contract with Hungarian team Puskás Akadémia.

International career
Băluță made his senior international debut for Romania on 13 June 2017, coming on as a 66th-minute substitute for Bogdan Stancu and managing to score the winner in a 3–2 victory over Chile.

Style of play
Typically an attacking midfielder or a winger, Băluță is also capable of playing in a more offensive role, being deployed by coach Devis Mangia as a false 9 in the 3–4–3 formation during his last season at Universitatea Craiova.

Personal life
His father, Dumitru, was also a footballer and played in Romania for Pandurii Târgu Jiu, Argeș Pitești, Jiul Petroșani and in Hungary for Kecskeméti TE.

Career statistics

Club

International

 (Romania score listed first, score column indicates score after each Băluță goal)

Honours

Club
Chindia Târgoviște
Liga III: 2010–11

Universitatea Craiova
Cupa României: 2017–18

Slavia Prague
Czech First League: 2018–19
Czech Cup: 2018–19

Individual
 DigiSport Liga I Player of the Month: July 2017

References

External links

1993 births
Living people
Sportspeople from Craiova
Romanian footballers
Association football midfielders
Association football wingers
Association football forwards
Liga I players
Liga II players
Liga III players
AFC Chindia Târgoviște players
FC Viitorul Constanța players
CS Universitatea Craiova players
Czech First League players
SK Slavia Prague players
FC Slovan Liberec players
Nemzeti Bajnokság I players
Puskás Akadémia FC players
Romania youth international footballers
Romania under-21 international footballers
Romania international footballers
Romanian expatriate footballers
Expatriate footballers in the Czech Republic
Romanian expatriate sportspeople in the Czech Republic
Expatriate footballers in Hungary
Romanian expatriate sportspeople in Hungary